Badarli is a village in the Sindhanur taluk of Raichur district in the Indian state of Karnataka. It is located near the stream joining the Tungabhadra river. Badarli lies on the Sindhanur-Olanallari route. Badarli is the most literate village in the Raichur district, influencing by the MLA of the town.

Demographics
 India census, Badarli had a population of 1,288 with 534 males and 654 females and 223 Households.

See also
Salagunda
Roudkunda
Amba Matha
Maski
Sindhanur
Raichur

References

External links
raichur.nic.in

Villages in Raichur district